Bhakuwal  is a village in Bhulath tehsil in Kapurthala district, Punjab state, India. The village is administrated by a Sarpanch.

Nearby cities
Bhulath
Kapurthala
Phagwara
Sultanpur Lodhi

Air travel connectivity 
The closest International airport to the village is Sri Guru Ram Dass Jee International Airport.

References

External links
 Villages in Kapurthala

Villages in Kapurthala district